Many of the largest dams and reservoirs in New Zealand have been developed principally to produce hydroelectricity. Other uses include irrigation and municipal water supply.

Hydro-electric dams

The main river systems comprising a series of dams and powerhouses are situated on the following rivers:
The Waikato River
The Waitaki River
The Clutha River

Other schemes are standalone developments associated with specific sites.

Tongariro Power Scheme
The Tongariro Power Scheme (1,400 GWh) diverts water from the south side of Mount Ruapehu and the west and north sides of Tongariro into Lake Taupō, and thus eventually into the Waikato River.
Rangipo (cavern) (120 MW)
Tokaanu (240 MW)
Moawhango Dam

The Waikato
The hydro stations, starting from Lake Taupō, are (capacity in MW and nominal annual energy output in GWh):
Aratiatia (84 MW) (331 GWh)
Ohakuri (112 MW) (400 GWh)
Atiamuri (84 MW) (305 GWh)
Whakamaru (100 MW) (486 GWh)
Maraetai (360 MW) (855 GWh)
Waipapa (51 MW) (330 GWh)
Arapuni (171 MW) (805 GWh)
Karapiro (90 MW) (490 GWh)

The Waitaki

The river was developed in multiple stages. The Waitaki dam was built first, without earthmoving machinery, followed by the development of the Aviemore Dam on Lake Aviemore and Benmore Dam on Lake Benmore. Lake Pukaki was initially dammed at this stage to provide storage and flow control. A small station was also installed on Lake Tekapo, but although it has a small dam to raise the pre-existing lake, water was taken through a  tunnel to a powerstation below the level of the lake.

In the 1960s, work was started on the Upper Waitaki project. This project consisted of taking the discharge from the original Tekapo (A) station through a power canal, the Tekapo Canal, to Tekapo B station at the edge of Lake Pukaki. The dam at Pukaki was increased in height. Water from Pukaki is then transferred into the Pukaki Canal which meets the Ohau Canal from Lake Ohau into Ohau A station and Lake Ruataniwha. The Ohau Canal continues beyond Lake Ruataniwha to Ohau B midway along, before emptying through Ohau C into Lake Benmore.

The stations are (capacity) (annual output) (commissioned)
Tekapo A  (25 MW) (160 GWh) 1955
Tekapo B (160 MW) (800 GWh) 1977
Ohau A   (264 MW) (1150 GWh) 1980
Ohau B  (212 MW) (970 GWh) 1984/1985
Ohau C  (212 MW) (970 GWh) 1984/1985

The original Waitaki power stations discharge water back into the Waitaki River which then forms a storage lake for the next station in the chain.
The three power stations are:
Benmore (540 MW) (2,200 GWh) 1965
Aviemore (220 MW) (940 GWh) 1968
Waitaki (105 MW) (500 GWh) 1935

Project Aqua was a proposed scheme of six dams on a man made canal running from the Waitaki Dam to the sea. It was cancelled by Meridian Energy on 29 March 2004.

Clutha River
Clyde Dam (445 MW)
Roxburgh Dam (320 MW)

Standalone hydroelectric schemes
Manapouri (850 MW) (4,800 GWh)
Manapouri does not rely on a high dam to provide water – it takes advantage of the natural 178-metre height difference between Lake Manapouri and the sea at Deep Cove in Doubtful Sound, in Fiordland. The power house is in a cavern, while two tailrace tunnels take the water from the power house  to Deep Cove and the sea. The Manapouri Control Structure (Mararoa dam) downstream from the original outlet of Lake Manapouri controls the lake level, and feeds water from the Mararoa river back up the river into the Lake.

Other schemes

North Island
Kaimai Scheme – Kaimai (0.4 MW), Lloyd Mandeno (15.6 MW), Lower Mangapapa (6.25 MW), Ruahihi (20 MW) – Scheme: (165 GWh)
Aniwhenua Dam (25 MW) (127 GWh) – Bay of Plenty (Upriver from Matahina dam)
Matahina Dam (36 MW) (300 GWh) – on the Rangitaiki River, Bay of Plenty
Lake Waikaremoana Scheme – 3 dams: Kaitawa (36 MW), Tuai (60 MW), and Piripaua (42 MW)
Wheao & Flaxy (26 MW) (115 GWh)
Hinemaiaia – A (2.25 MW), B (1.35 MW), C (2.85 MW) – (30 GWh) – near Taupō
Motukawa (4.6 MW) (25.8 GWh) – Taranaki
Mangorie (4.5 MW) (20.9 GWh) – Taranaki
Patea Dam (31 MW) (115 GWh) (Peak Station) – Taranaki
Mangahao Dam (30 MW) – Tararuas
Kourarau Scheme (1 MW) – Wairarapa

South Island
Waihopai (2.5 MW) (11.8 GWh)
Branch River – (Wairau & Argyle Stations) (11 MW) (54.3 GWh) – run of river canals
Cobb Reservoir and Cobb Power Station (32 MW) – Golden Bay
Arnold Dam (3 MW) (25 GWh) – West Coast
Dillmans (0.5 MW), Duffers (3.655 MW), Kumara (6.5 MW) – Scheme: (47.9 GWh)
Kaniere Forks (0.43 MW) (3.75 GWssdn ruwehruehre h) & MacKays Creek (1.1 MW) (8 GWh)
Wahapo (3.1 MW) (14.5 GWh) – South Westland
Lake Coleridge (45 MW) (205 to 300 GWh) – Canterbury – diverted rivers and natural lake
Highbank (25.2 MW) (115 GWh) – Canterbury – joint power & irrigation
Montalto (1.1 MW – 1.8 MW) (12 GWh) – Canterbury – joint power & irrigation
Opuha Dam (7.5 MW) – Canterbury – joint power & irrigation
Paerau (10 MW, 47.8 GWh) & Patearoa (2.25 MW, 7.5 GWh) – Taieri River, Otago – joint power & irrigation
Waipori – 4 dams (12 MW, 57 MW, 7 MW, 8 MW) – Dunedin
Monowai (6 MW) (34 GWh)
Roaring Meg – 2 power stations (1.3MW, 3MW) (30 GWh)

Municipal water supply dams

Auckland

Cosseys Dam – Auckland
Hays Creek Dam – Auckland
Upper Huia Dam – Auckland
Lower Huia Dam – Auckland
Mangatangi Dam – Auckland
Mangatawhiri Dam – Auckland
Upper Nihotupu Dam – Auckland
Lower Nihotupu Dam – Auckland
Waitākere Dam and Reservoir – Auckland
Wairoa Dam – Auckland

Other North Island
Clapcott Concrete Arch (Mangapoike or Gisborne No. 1) Dam - Gisborne
Kaitoke Weir – Upper Hutt
Macaskill Lakes – Upper Hutt
Mangamahoe Dam - New Plymouth
Okehu Stream/Waitahinga Dam (Rangitatau Weir) - Wanganui (Whanganui)
Upper and Lower Turitea - Palmerston North
Whau Valley Dam – Whangarei
Wilsons Dam – Whangarei

South Island
Waitohi (Barnes) Dam - Picton
Maitai Dam - Nelson
Opuha Dam – Canterbury, also has small hydro-electric scheme (7.5 MW)
Ross Creek Reservoir – Dunedin
Sullivan's Dam – Dunedin

Defunct dams
 Birchville Dam – Upper Hutt
Johnsonville Waterworks - Ohariu Valley
Korokoro Dam
Morton Dam - Wainuiomata
Upper and Lower Karori Dams and the Karori Reservoirs – Wellington (now a nature reserve)
Teviot Dam - Roxburgh
Waitohi Weir (1891) - Picton 
Williams Dam - Picton

Irrigation dams
Lakes Manuwai and Waingaro at Kerikeri, purpose-built irrigation dams containing 12,800,000 m3 of water
Opuha Dam

See also
Rivers of New Zealand
Lakes in New Zealand
List of lakes in New Zealand
List of power stations in New Zealand
Lake Benmore
Lake Aviemore
Lake Ruataniwha
Lake Waitaki

Notes

Further reading
 Retired civil engineer and dam inspector examines the development of New Zealand dam construction techniques and uses from the 1860s to the 1950s for municipal water supply, mining, kauri logging and development of the Lake Waikarimoana Natural Dam for hydroelectric power.

External links
Dams in the 1966 Encyclopaedia of New Zealand
Conventional Hydroelectric Power Plants in New Zealand
Trustpower Generation – November 2001 Report (PDF)
Waikato Hydroelectric Scheme

 
New Zealand
 
Dams
Dams